The Prime Minister's Prize for Australian History was created by the Prime Minister of Australia, John Howard following the Australian History Summit held in Canberra on 17 August 2006. The Summit looked at how the Australian government could strengthen Australian history in the school curriculum. The winner (or winners) receive a gold medallion and a grant worth A$100,000.

The prize is awarded to an individual or a group, for an outstanding publication or body of work that contributes significantly to an understanding of Australian history. The subject of works submitted can include, but are not limited to:
 historical events;
 historical figures (including biographies) and
 work covering a relevant subject.

In 2012, the prize was incorporated into the Prime Minister's Literary Awards.

Honorees

See also
 List of history awards

References

History awards
Australia history-related lists
Australian non-fiction book awards
Awards established in 2007
Prime Minister of Australia